The Ronga River is a river of the Marlborough Region of New Zealand's South Island. Although its source is on a ridge only  from the island's north coast, the river flows south, reaching the Rai River close to the township of Rai Valley.

References

Rivers of the Marlborough Region
Rivers of New Zealand